Stambaugh Stadium, officially Arnold D. Stambaugh Stadium, is a multi-purpose stadium in Youngstown, Ohio, United States, on the campus of Youngstown State University. The stadium was built in 1982, and is primarily used for American football. It is the home venue for the Youngstown State Penguins football team, a member of the National Collegiate Athletic Association (NCAA) at the Division I Football Championship Division (FCS) level and the Missouri Valley Football Conference.

History
When it opened in 1982, Stambaugh had one large grandstand on the west side, with a seating capacity of approximately 17,000. During their time at Stambaugh, the football team has risen to become a power in FCS football, qualifying for NCAA Division I Football Championship playoffs 12 times, advancing to the championship game on six occasions, and winning four national championships through the 2015 season. The stadium is also known by fans as the "Ice Castle".

The stadium's 25th Anniversary was celebrated during the 2007 season, and the top 25 players in the stadium's first 25 years were honored at a ceremony on September 15, 2007. Those players were:

Tony Bowens (1987–90)
Adrian Brown (1996–99)
Pat Crummey (1998–2001)
Pat Danko (1988–91)
Harry Deligianis (1995–97)
Drew Gerber (1990–93)
LeVar Greene (1998–2001)
Matt Hogg (1994–97)
Tim Johnson (1999–2000)
Leon Jones (1992–95)
Todd Kollar (1994–97)
Paul McFadden (1980–83)
Marcus Mason (2005–06)
P.J. Mays (2000–02)
Dave Roberts (1989–92)
Jeff Ryan (1998–2001)
Ian Shirey (1996–99)
Dwyte Smiley (1996–99)
Randy Smith (1991–94)
Tamron Smith (1990–93)
Paul Soltis (1987–89)
Lester Weaver (1991–94)
Paris Wicks (1979–82)
Jeff Wilkins (1990–93)
Jim Zdelar (1987–88)

Renovations
The stadium was upgraded and expanded prior to the 1997 athletic season with the addition of over 3,000 bleacher seats on the east side of the field, on the site of a practice field. In addition, a new press box was created and 14 additional luxury suites were built, along with a stadium club, which hosts the football team's weekly press conferences and is rented out for private events.  Since 1997, the stadium's capacity is 20,630, making it the largest stadium in the Missouri Valley Football Conference.

In the summer of 2009, an auxiliary scoreboard was constructed in the south end zone, giving Stambaugh Stadium a scoreboard in each end zone. New reserved chairback seats were also installed during the 2009 season along with two new flagpoles next to the scoreboard in the north end zone, one for the Ohio flag and one for the United States flag.

Other uses
In addition to hosting football and soccer home games, Stambaugh is also the home of YSU's athletic offices, football locker rooms and weight rooms, racquetball courts, ROTC offices, and visitor locker rooms. From 1996–2012, Stambaugh Stadium was also the home field for the YSU women's soccer team.

See also
 List of NCAA Division I FCS football stadiums

References

College football venues
Sports venues in Ohio
Sports in Youngstown, Ohio
Youngstown State Penguins football
Soccer venues in Ohio
College soccer venues in the United States
Buildings and structures in Youngstown, Ohio
Sports venues completed in 1982
Tourist attractions in Youngstown, Ohio
1982 establishments in Ohio